Razdolna (Russian: Раздольна) is a small unincorporated community in Kenai Peninsula Borough, Alaska, United States.  Located on the Kenai Peninsula, it lies roughly 30 miles east of Homer. The community is one of several settlements of Russian Old Believers in the Fox River area. There are about 30 families in Razdolna. In 2009 the Mile 17 fire threatened the hamlet.

References

Unincorporated communities in Kenai Peninsula Borough, Alaska
Russian communities in the United States
Russian-American culture in Alaska
Unincorporated communities in Alaska
Old Believer communities in the United States